The 2022 Copa CONMEBOL Libertadores Femenina was the 14th edition of the CONMEBOL Libertadores Femenina (also referred to as the Copa Libertadores Femenina), South America's premier women's club football tournament organized by CONMEBOL. The tournament was held in Ecuador from 13 to 28 October 2022. Corinthians were the defending champions but they were eliminated in the quarter-finals.

Palmeiras (Brazil) defeated Boca Juniors (Argentina) 4–1 in the final to win their first title.

Format
For the group stage, the 16 teams were drawn into four groups. Teams in each group played one another in a round-robin basis, with the top two teams of each group advancing to the quarter-finals. Starting from the quarter-finals, the teams played a single-elimination tournament.

Teams
The 16 teams were:
the champions of all ten CONMEBOL associations
the title holders
an additional team from the host association
four additional teams from associations with the best historical performance in the tournament (associations in bold receive two berths according to the points total until the 2021 edition).
Brazil: 240 points
Chile: 140 points
Colombia: 135 points
Paraguay: 112 points
Argentina: 90 points
Venezuela: 78 points
Ecuador: 62 points
Uruguay: 52 points
Bolivia: 39 points
Peru: 37 points

Notes

Venues
The matches were played in Quito. Initially two stadiums (Estadio Gonzalo Pozo Ripalda and Estadio Banco Guayaquil) would host the group stage. On 15 October 2022, CONMEBOL announced that the Estádio Banco Guayaquil would no longer host matches, and matches originally to be played there would be moved to Estadio Rodrigo Paz Delgado.

The stadiums were:
Estadio Gonzalo Pozo Ripalda  (capacity: 21,489)
Estadio Banco Guayaquil  (capacity: 12,000)
Estadio Rodrigo Paz Delgado  (capacity: 41,575)

Match officials
On 21 September 2022, CONMEBOL announced the referees and assistant referees appointed for the tournament.

Draw
The draw for the tournament was held on 20 September 2022, 12:00 PYT (UTC−4), at the CONMEBOL Convention Center in Luque, Paraguay. The 16 teams were drawn into four groups of four.

Two teams were directly assigned to the head of groups A and B.

To Group A: as 2021 Copa Libertadores Femenina champions, Corinthians (Brazil 1)
To Group B: the champions of the host association, Ñañas (Ecuador 1)

The remaining teams (excluding the four teams from national associations with an extra berth) were seeded into three pots based on the final placement of their national association's club in the previous edition of the tournament, excluding the champions, with the highest two (Brazil 2 and Colombia 1) placed in Pot 1, the next four (Uruguay, Peru, Paraguay 1 and Chile 1) placed in Pot 2 and the lowest four (Ecuador 2, Argentina, Venezuela and Bolivia) in Pot 3. The four additional teams from associations with the best historical performance (Brazil 3, Chile 2, Colombia 2 and Paraguay 2) were seeded into Pot 4. From Pot 1, the first team drawn was placed into group C and the second team drawn placed into group D, both teams assigned to position 1 in their group. From each remaining pot, the first team drawn was placed into Group A, the second team drawn placed into Group B, the third team drawn placed into Group C and the final team drawn placed into Group D, with teams from Pot 2, 3 and 4 assigned to positions 2, 3 and 4 in their group. Teams from the same association could not be drawn into the same group.

The draw resulted in the following groups:

Group stage
In the group stage, the teams were ranked according to points (3 points for a win, 1 point for a draw, 0 points for a loss). If tied on points, tiebreakers would be applied in the following order (Regulations Article 23).
Goal difference;
Goals scored;
Head-to-head result in games between tied teams;
Number of red cards;
Number of yellow cards;
Drawing of lots.

The winners and runners-up of each group advanced to the quarter-finals.

All times are local, ECT (UTC−5).

Group A

Group B

Notes

Group C

Notes

Group D

Final stages
Starting from the quarter-finals, the teams played a single-elimination tournament. If tied after full time, extra time would not be played, and the penalty shoot-out would be used to determine the winners (Regulations Article 25).

Bracket

Quarter-finals

Semi-finals

Third place match

Final

Statistics

Top goalscorers

Final ranking
As per statistical convention in football, matches decided in extra time were counted as wins and losses, while matches decided by penalty shoot-out were counted as draws.

See also
2021–22 UEFA Women's Champions League
2022 Copa Libertadores

References

2022
2022 in women's association football
2022 in South American football
International club association football competitions hosted by Ecuador
October 2022 sports events in Ecuador